The following list of Carnegie libraries in Hawaii provides detailed information on the United States Carnegie library in Hawaii, where 1 library was built from 1 grant (totaling $100,000) awarded by the Carnegie Corporation of New York in 1909.

Carnegie libraries

Notes

References

Note: The above references, while all authoritative, are not entirely mutually consistent. Some details of this list may have been drawn from one of the references (usually Jones) without support from the others.  Reader discretion is advised.

Hawaii
 
Libraries
Libraries